Sen o przyszłości is the second studio album by Polish singer-songwriter Sylwia Grzeszczak, released on 11 October 2011 under EMI Music Poland. Production for the album took place through 2011, with Polish rapper Liber and Grzesczak herself serving as the producers. It consists of 11 songs, including one in Russian language. Two singles preceded the album: "Małe rzeczy" and "Sen o przyszłości". A third single, "Karuzela", was released on 4 January 2012.

Less than two weeks after its premiere, the album became platinum.

Track listing

Charts and certifications

Weekly charts

Certifications

References

2011 albums
EMI Records albums
Polish-language albums